Unstoppable: Finding Hidden Assets to Renew the Core and Fuel Profitable Growth is a non-fiction book on business strategy by American business consultant Chris Zook. This is the third book in his Profit from the Core trilogy, preceded by Profit from the Core released in 2001 and Beyond the Core in 2004.

Overview
In previous books in the trilogy, Zook explained how to expand, exploit, and support the current core of a company's business model. Firms usually go through a common growth cycle. Initially, they focus their resources on establishing their core businesses and using them against competition. Then, companies should leverage their strengths and move into closely related areas of business. Finally, companies exhaust these opportunities and have to redefine their cores, making hard decisions and launching a necessary transformation. When a company tries to redefine its core, often managers follow one of three paths—they commit ever more deeply to what they currently do, they move into segments where they have no experience, or they merge with some other group to create a new megacompany.

Zook argues that each of those moves has a very small chance of success over the long term. The chances are much better when companies examine what they already have, and then map out how to leverage those hidden assets. Zook divides these assets in three categories: undervalued business platforms, unexploited customer assets, and underutilized capabilities. If the company moves in these areas where it already has experience, it may successfully redefine itself to meet the next growth period.

Criticism

—Review by First Friday Book Synopsis

See also
 5 forces model
 Business models
 Competitive advantage
 Coopetition
 Core competency
 Strategic management
Value Migration: How to Think Several Moves Ahead of the Competition

References

External links
Official website
Official website

2007 non-fiction books
American non-fiction books
Business books
Harvard Business Publishing books